Baksh may refer to:

People
 Ali Baksh, a Hindustani classical musician and teacher
 Charles Baksh, cricketer
 Dave Baksh, Canadian guitarist and singer
 Murad Baksh, youngest son of Mughal emperor Shah Jahan and empress Mumtaz Mahal
 Wahid Baksh Bhutto, landowner of Sindh
 Imam Baksh Pahalwan, wrestler and a practitioner of the Indian wrestling style of Pehlwani
 Captain Wahid Baksh Sial Rabbani, a saint in the Chishti (Sabri branch) order of Sufis
 Sammy Baksh, Guyanese singer-songwriter

Other uses
 Khuda Baksh Oriental Library, in Patna, Bihar, India